Richard Paul LeMay (August 28, 1938 – March 19, 2018) was an American professional baseball player. A left-handed pitcher, LeMay appeared in parts of three Major League Baseball seasons (1961–63), but had a long career in minor league baseball. He was born in Cincinnati, Ohio, and graduated from Withrow High School.

He signed with the San Francisco Giants in 1958 and was recalled from the minor leagues during the 1961 season, appearing in 27 games for the Giants that season, starting five. He dropped six of nine decisions and recorded an earned run average of 3.56 and one complete game in  innings pitched. He had nine-game trials with the 1962 Giants and the 1963 Chicago Cubs, and was winless in two decisions. All told he won three games, lost eight and had a career ERA of 4.17 in 45 Major League games. In 108 innings pitched, he surrendered 100 hits and 49 bases on balls. He struck out 69, and was credited with four saves. In his lone MLB complete game, on June 24, 1961, at Busch Stadium, he defeated the St. Louis Cardinals, 6–1, allowing six hits; future Baseball Hall of Famer Bob Gibson took the loss.

After he returned to minor league baseball in 1963, LeMay had a successful career as a starting pitcher at the Triple-A level through 1970, reaching the double digits in wins for six consecutive seasons, including 17- and 16-victory seasons in 1965 and 1968. All told, he won 139 games and lost 124 as a minor league pitcher. LeMay also managed at the Class A level in the Cubs' farm system in 1971–72 and was a scout for the Philadelphia Phillies in the 1970s and the Montréal Expos during the 1980s.

LeMay died on March 19, 2018.

References

External links

Venezuelan Professional Baseball League

1938 births
2018 deaths
Atlanta Crackers players
Baseball players from Cincinnati
Chicago Cubs players
Corpus Christi Giants players
Industriales de Valencia players
Jacksonville Suns players
Major League Baseball pitchers
Michigan Wolverines baseball players
Minor league baseball managers
Montreal Expos scouts
Phoenix Giants players
Philadelphia Phillies scouts
Quincy Cubs players
Rio Grande Valley Giants players
Salt Lake City Bees players
San Francisco Giants players
Springfield Giants players
Tacoma Cubs players
Tacoma Giants players
Tulsa Oilers (baseball) players
Victoria Giants players